is a former Japanese football player and manager. He played for Japan national team.

Club career
Shiji was born in Aichi Prefecture on October 20, 1938. When he was a Kwansei Gakuin University student, he won 1959 Emperor's Cup as a member of Kwangaku Club was consisted of his alma mater Kwansei Gakuin University players and graduates. After graduating from Kwansei Gakuin University, he played for his local club Toyota Motors.

National team career
On May 28, 1961, when Shiji was a Kwansei Gakuin University student, he debuted and scored a goal for Japan national team against Malaya.

Coaching career
In 1965, Shiji became a manager for Toyota Motors. In 1966, the club joined Japanese Regional Leagues. He promoted the club to new division Japan Soccer League (JSL) Division 2 in 1972 and JSL Division 1 in 1973. He resigned in 1974.

National team statistics

References

External links
 
 Japan National Football Team Database
 Japan Football Association official site

1938 births
Living people
Kwansei Gakuin University alumni
Association football people from Aichi Prefecture
Japanese footballers
Japan international footballers
Nagoya Grampus players
Japanese football managers
Association football forwards